Banasthali Vidyapith (Banasthali University) is a university located in the Tonk district of the Rajasthan state in India. It is a deemed university offering programs at the secondary, senior secondary, undergraduate, and postgraduate degree levels.

History

Banasthali Vidyapith was founded on 6 October 1935 by freedom fighters and educationists Hiralal Shastri and Ratan Shastri. The institution was declared as a 'Deemed University' in 1983. While NAAC has re-accredited Banasthali Vidyapith at the highest possible ‘Grade A’ level in 2011, the Review Committee (Tandon Committee) of Ministry of HRD also appreciated the overall efforts of Vidyapith in the areas of Institutional Governance, Academic Achievements, Research, Student Progression, Infrastructure etc. and categorized Banasthali Vidyapith under ‘Category A’ list of ‘Institutions Deemed to be University’ in 2010. The university is featured in NIRF, QS I Gauge, and Times Higher Education rankings. In 2020, NAAC accredited this university with A++ grading.

The Vidyapith has had virtual autonomy for its school programmes since the beginning and was affiliated to an outside agency for its university programmes in 1983. In 1983, the government of India, on the advice of the University Grants Commission, notified the Vidyapith as an institution deemed to be university.

After attaining university status, The Vidyapith restructured its undergraduate programme. At the postgraduate level, it introduced courses in Computer Science, Operational Research, Electronics and Biotechnology. Teacher Education and Management have been started. New courses include M.Sc. (Bio-Informatics), M.Sc. (Pharmaceutical Chemistry) and M.Sc. (Applied Microbiology).

Along with professional programmes such as MBA and MCA, all postgraduate courses in the Faculty of Science have a semester system. From 2004, all Social Science, Humanities and Home Science Post-graduate programmes have been run as semester courses.

Campus
The campus is a sprawling 850 acres, located about 80 kilometres from the capital city of Jaipur, in the Tonk district of Rajasthan, India. The campus has been broadly divided into the school division, the University division and the residential blocks. The residential blocks feature 29 hostels each with the capacity of housing up to 438 students.

The Laxmi Bai maidan(field) which is approximately 2660 square km. is used for parades and annual fairs, whereas the Vidula maidan (4195 sq. km. approx.) has fields for games such as hockey, volleyball, tennis, yoga, martial arts and mass physical display activities. The Veer Bala maidan is used for horse riding and the Shakuntlam playground is the cricket ground of the campus. The campus also features a swimming pool.

The campus also features a licensed airstrip of 50,191,418 sq. metres, which is used to train the students in flying and guiding.

Banasthali Vidyapith also features its own hospital called Apaji Arogya Mandir, a guest house for parents and official guests, and a community radio station called Radio Banasthali.

Organisation and administration

Management
The main statutory bodies of Banasthali Vidyapith are:
 General Council
 Executive Council
 Finance Council
 Academic Council

Officers
 President
 Vice-President
 Vice-Chancellor
 Pro Vice-Chancellor
 Treasurer
 Secretary
 Deans, including Deans/Heads of the Centres of Higher Education 
 Co-ordinator, School Education

Academics

Academic programmes

School Education 
Banasthali Vidyapith provides school education from elementary to senior secondary. At the senior secondary level, student can opt for Science, Commerce or Humanities as their stream.

Undergraduate programs 
The university offers 18 undergraduate programs in the disciplines of Mathematics, Science, Management, Commerce, Arts, Engineering, Aviation, Education, Design, Law, and Journalism. All the programs are of three years duration except for the Bachelor of Education (B.Ed) which is of 2 years, BA LLB which is of 5 years and the Bachelor of Technology (B.Tech) which is of 4 years.

Postgraduate Programs 
The university offers 61 masters programs and 32 Doctorates in the disciplines of Humanities, Social Sciences, Sciences, Law, Education, Commerce and Management.

Accreditation
The National Assessment and Accreditation Council (NAAC) accredited Banasthali University with ‘A++' grade. The Ministry of HRD has listed the university under the top 'MHRD A Category.

Atal Incubation Center 
Banasthali Vidyapith has partnered with Atal Innovation Mission, NITI Aayog to establish first of its kind all women Atal Incubation Centre.

National Resource Center in Management 
MHRD has set up Center of Excellence in Management at Banasthali Vidyapith for developing Annual Refresher Program in Teaching. The online modules are hosted by SWAYAM Portal.

Rankings

The National Institutional Ranking Framework (NIRF) ranked Banasthali Vidyapith 79th overall in India in 2020, 55th among universities and 20 in the pharmacy ranking.

Notable alumni
 Sumitra Singh, Former Speaker, Rajasthan Legislative Assembly
Prof. (Dr.) Hemlata Talesra, educationalist and activist
 Kamla Beniwal, governor of Gujarat
 Avani Chaturvedi, one of India's leading fighter pilots
 Sunita Godara, marathon runner
 Meira Kumar, speaker of Lok Sabha
Anuradha Bhattacharyya, writer and poet
Yashoda Devi, former Member of the Legislative Assembly
Atiqa Bano, educationist and activist

References

Banasthali Vidyapith
Women's universities and colleges in Rajasthan
Tonk district
Educational institutions established in 1935
Jain universities and colleges
1935 establishments in India